William, Will or Bill Rigby may refer to:

 Will Rigby (footballer) (1906–1977), English footballer for Wigan Borough, Stockport County and Rochdale, see List of Rochdale A.F.C. players (25–99 appearances)
 Bill Rigby (footballer) (1921–2010), former English footballer
 Bill Rigby (politician) (1923–2003), Australian politician
 Will Rigby (b. 1956), American musician